David Michael Satterfield (born December 18, 1954) is an American diplomat and ambassador, who has served extensively in the Middle East, including the Persian Gulf area, Lebanon, and Iraq. He later served as a senior advisor on Iraq for Secretary of State Condoleezza Rice and was director general of the Multinational Force and Observers, the peacekeeping force for the Sinai Peninsula from June 2009 until August 2017. He was chargé d'affaires to Egypt from August 2013 to January 2014 and was subsequently Special Advisor to the Secretary of State for Libya. From September 2017 to June 2019 he served as the acting assistant secretary of state for Near Eastern affairs, and was confirmed as U.S. ambassador to Turkey on June 27, 2019.

On February 15, 2019, President Donald Trump announced his intention to appoint Satterfield as the next United States Ambassador to Turkey, succeeding John Bass. On May 17, 2019, U.S. Senator Chuck Grassley placed a hold on Satterfield over a dispute with the State Department regarding a new terrorism bill. On June 27, 2019, Satterfield was confirmed by the Senate.

In January 2022, David Satterfield became the new U.S. envoy for the Horn of Africa, a position he held until June 2022. On May 31, Rice University announced that Satterfield would become the new director of the James A. Baker III Institute for Public Policy, succeeding Edward Djerejian.

Biography
Born in Baltimore, Maryland, Satterfield graduated from the University of Maryland, College Park, with a bachelor of arts in 1976.

He entered the Foreign Service in 1980, and has served overseas in Jeddah, Tunis, Beirut, Algiers, Damascus, and Baghdad. Director of the Department of State executive secretariat staff from 1990 to 1993, Satterfield served on the National Security Council staff from 1993 to 1996 as director for Near Eastern and South Asian Affairs. He held the position of director of the Department of State’s Office of Israel and Arab-Israeli Affairs from 1996 to 1998, and was the ambassador to Lebanon from September 1998 to June 2001.

The United States Senate confirmed Satterfield to succeed Edward William Gnehm Jr. as ambassador to Jordan, but shortly thereafter (on June 1, 2004) the secretary of state designated him principal deputy assistant secretary for Near Eastern Affairs (having served for the previous three years as NEA deputy assistant secretary), and in May 2005 he was sent to Iraq as deputy chief of mission with rank of ambassador. As a result, he never assumed his post in Jordan. On May 19, 2006, the Department of State announced Satterfield’s appointment as coordinator for Iraq and senior adviser to Secretary of State Condoleezza Rice.

In May 2009, Satterfield retired with the rank of career minister from his nearly thirty-year career in the Foreign Service. Upon nomination by the U.S. government, he was then appointed director general of the Multinational Force and Observers (MFO), an independent international organization, by the Arab Republic of Egypt and State of Israel, and assumed office on July 1, 2009. The MFO, whose mission is the implementation of the security provisions of the Egyptian-Israeli Treaty of Peace, is headquartered in Rome, with peacekeeping responsibilities in the Sinai. The director general is responsible for exercising his authority through his staff at the headquarters in Rome, the force commander and his staff in the Sinai, and the director general’s representatives and their staffs in Cairo and Tel Aviv. Satterfield returned to the Foreign Service and served as chief of mission in Cairo from August 2013 to January 2014 and was special advisor to the secretary of state for Libya from May to September 2014. On September 5, 2017, he returned to active duty as a senior foreign service officer and was appointed to serve as assistant secretary of state (acting) for Near Eastern Affairs.

On 10 January 2022, Satterfield was appointed U.S. special envoy for the Horn of Africa, replacing Jeffrey Feltman. Satterfield was replaced by Mike Hammer in June 2022.

Personal life
Satterfield speaks Arabic, French, and Italian.

Awards 
Ambassador Satterfield is the recipient of the:
 Presidential Distinguished Executive Rank Award;
 Presidential Meritorious Executive Rank Award;
 The Secretary of State's Distinguished Service Award (for Iraq service);
 Department of State Distinguished Honor Award;
 Four Department of State Superior Honor Awards, notably for his work on the Middle East peace process;
 Department of the Army Outstanding Civilian Service Award (for Iraq service).

See also
List of current ambassadors of the United States

References

External links

 State Dept profile
 

1954 births
Living people
University of Maryland, College Park alumni
Ambassadors of the United States to Egypt
Ambassadors of the United States to Lebanon
Ambassadors of the United States to Turkey
United States Foreign Service personnel
20th-century American diplomats
21st-century American diplomats
United States Assistant Secretaries of State